An oxidizing acid is a Brønsted acid that is a strong oxidizing agent. Most Brønsted acids can act as oxidizing agents, because the acidic proton can be reduced to hydrogen gas. Some acids contain other structures that act as stronger oxidizing agents than hydrogen ions. Generally, they contain oxygen in their anionic structure. These include nitric acid, perchloric acid, chloric acid, chromic acid, and concentrated sulfuric acid, among others.

General properties

Oxidizing acids, being strong oxidizing agents, can often oxidize certain less reactive metals, in which the active oxidizing agent is not H+ ions. For example, copper is a rather unreactive metal, and has no reaction with concentrated hydrochloric acid. However, even dilute nitric acid can oxidize copper to Cu2+ ions, with the nitrate ions acting as the effective oxidant:

 3 Cu + 8 HNO3 → 3 Cu2+ + 2 NO + 4 H2O + 6 

Sometimes the concentration of the acid is a factor for it to be strongly oxidizing. Again, copper has no reaction with dilute sulfuric acid, but in concentrated sulfuric acid, the highly acidic environment and high concentration of sulfate ions allow the sulfate ions to act as an oxidizing agent:

 Cu + 2 H2SO4 → SO2 + 2 H2O +  + Cu2+

See also
Reduction potential
Standard electrode potential (data page)